Drene Time (aka The Drene Show) was a 30-minute radio variety show starring Don Ameche and singer-actress Frances Langford as co-hosts, airing on NBC's Sunday night schedule (10-10:30pm Eastern) in 1946–47.

The series was sponsored by Procter & Gamble's Drene Shampoo, and the announcer was Tobe Reed. Drene Time usually opened with Langford singing a big band-style arrangement. Then Ameche and Langford would slip into comedy, often aided by co-star Danny Thomas, in routines involving Thomas' frustration that Ameche was less of an actor than Thomas.

After another musical number and a commercial spot for Drene Shampoo, Ameche and Langford appeared as the Bickersons for the final 15 minutes of the show. The Bickersons segment, at that time, was titled,  "The Honeymoon Is Over."

The program featured the music of Carmen Dragon and His Orchestra. Also in the cast was Gale Gordon. The series was written by Philip Rapp and produced by Carlton Alsop. The first official broadcast was September 8, 1946, featuring Ameche, Dragon, Langford and Thomas. That broadcast started with Don explaining the new variety format to Carmen and Frances, after which she sang "Sooner or Later", which was later adapted for the film Dick Tracy (1990).

An early audition show of July 31, 1946 featured a different cast: Don Ameche, guest Sylvia Sidney, announcer Truman Bradley, Joseph Lilley and His Orchestra, Pinky Lee, Jim Backus, the Swing Choir, Jonelle James, Earle Ross and announcer Marvin Miller.

The series was adapted for television in 1950 as Star Time.

External links
Jerry Haendiges Vintage Radio Logs: Drene Time

1940s American radio programs
American variety radio programs
NBC radio programs